The 2017 PEI Tankard, the provincial men's curling championship of Prince Edward Island, was held from January 18 to 22 at the Silver Fox Curling and Yacht Community Complex in Summerside, Prince Edward Island. The winning Eddie MacKenzie team represented Prince Edward Island at the 2017 Tim Hortons Brier in St. John's, Newfoundland and Labrador.

Teams
The teams are listed as follows:

Knockout Draw Brackets

A Event

B Event

C Event

Playoffs

Semifinal
Sunday, January 22, 9:00 am

Final
Sunday, January 22, 2:30 pm

References

http://peicurling.com/tankard20162017/

2017 Tim Hortons Brier
Curling competitions in Prince Edward Island
Sport in Summerside, Prince Edward Island
2017 in Prince Edward Island
January 2017 sports events in Canada